Teymur bey Novruzov (Azerbaijani: Teymur bəy Npvruzov, born April 20, 1880, Qovlar, Elizavetpol uezd, Elisabethpol Governorate, Russian Empire – died 1961, Nice, France) was a decorated Imperial Russian and Azerbaijani military commander, having the rank of major-general. 

His father Mirza Haji bey Novruzov was also general.

Life 
He was born in 1880 in Qovlar village of the Elizavetpol uezd in the Russian Empire. He received general education in the Tbilisi Cadet Corpus. 

He began his military service in 1898. He promoted from the rank of soldier to the rank of major general. After the collapse of the Russian Empire, he joined the army of the Azerbaijan Democratic Republic. He was promoted to the rank of Major General by the order of the Democratic Republic of Azerbaijan on 2 August 1919.

After occupation of Azerbaijan by Bolsheviks, he was one of the organizers of the Ganja revolt. He emigrated to Germany because of suppression of revolt. 

He died in Nice in 1961.

References

1880 births
1961 deaths
Imperial Russian Army generals
Azerbaijani people of World War I
Generals of the Azerbaijan Democratic Republic
Azerbaijani nobility
Azerbaijani generals of Imperial Russian Army
Participants of the Ganja revolt
Soviet emigrants to Germany